This is a list of 2010 events that occurred in Europe.

Events

January 

January 1: Spain assumed the Presidency of the Council of the European Union from Sweden.
January 3: Two passenger trains collided in Bilecik, Turkey. One train driver was killed and seven passengers were injured.
January 7: 22 people had died in the UK due to a cold snap.
January 10: The opposition Social Democrat, Ivo Josipović, won 60.3% of the vote in the second round run-off, beating the mayor of Zagreb, Milan Bandić.
January 11: More than 5,300 residents in the regions of Shkodër and Lezhë were evacuated due to severe flooding in northern Albania.
January 25: Ethiopian Airlines Flight 409 crashed into the Mediterranean Sea shortly after take-off from Beirut Rafic Hariri International Airport, killing all 90 people on board.

February 
February 3: The sculpture L'Homme qui marche I by Alberto Giacometti sells in London for £65 million (US$103.7 million), setting a new world record for a work of art sold at auction.
February 16: A bus carrying French children on a school trip has overturned in Italy, killing at least three people on board and injuring another 20.
February 18: A scattered exchange of gunfire on the line of contact dividing Azerbaijani and the Karabakh Armenian military forces left six people dead and one wounded.
February 25: A collision between two trains in Buizingen, Belgium, left 18 people dead and 162 injured.
February 26: At least 63 people were killed and one million homes were left without power in western France after cyclone Xynthia crossed Western Europe.

March 
March 20: 67 people were arrested and several people were injured in Bolton town centre during a clash between members of the English Defence League and Unite Against Fascism.
March 24: A set of 16 goods wagons runaway for 8 km from a freight station at Alnabru in Oslo to hit and destroy a quayside warehouse. Three people died, and four were seriously injured.
March 29: At least 40 people died after two female suicide bombers struck the Moscow Metro.
March 31: A coach crashed into a river after falling from a bridge in a snowstorm in Lanark, Scotland, killing a 17-year-old girl and injuring 44 passengers.

April 

April 1: A locomotive ran into a stationary passengers tram after its brakes failed during a test ride in Spišská Nová Ves, Slovakia, killing three people and injuring seriously eight others.
April 10: The President of Poland, Lech Kaczyński, was among 96 killed when their airplane crashed in western Russia.
April 12: A passenger train was hit by a landslide and partially derailed near Merano, Italy, killing 9 and injuring 28.
April 14: Over 95,000 flights had been cancelled all across Europe because violent eruptions of Eyjafjallajökull.
April 25: Austrian candidate for chairmanship, Heinz Fischer, won the presidential election with 79.3% of the valid votes.

May 

May 5: Up to 500,000 people protested in front of the Greek Parliament amid plans to cut public spending and raise taxes as austerity measures in exchange for a €110 billion bail-out. The protest degenerated in violences between protesters and riot police, resulting in three deaths and dozens of injuries.
May 14: Throughout Eastern Europe, 21 people were killed in floods triggered by the Windstorm Yolanda.
May 24: Three people were killed and 35 injured when a Honda Civic car collided with a school bus near Keswick, Cumbria.

June 
June 2: 13 people were killed and 25 injured in a shooting spree in Cumbria, England.
June 6: A passenger train collided with boulders that had fallen on the line near Falls of Cruachan, Scotland, derailed and caught fire. Several people were hospitalised and the line was blocked for a week.
June 15: Heavy rainfall in southern France caused severe floods in the department of Var, resulting in at least 25 deaths.
June 23: A passenger train struck a group of people who were crossing the railway on the level at Platja de Castelldefels station near Barcelona. Twelve people were killed, and fourteen injured.

July 

July 1: Belgium assumed the Presidency of the Council of the European Union from Spain.
July 11: A traffic accident, near Inishowen, in Ireland, killed eight people.
July 13: Two trains collided at Korzybie, in north Poland, injuring 36 people.
July 18: Fourteen people were killed and twelve injured after a bus fell off a cliff in northern Albania, near the city of Durrës.
July 23: One person was killed and 42 were injured when an eastbound Glacier Express derailed near Fiesch on the Matterhorn Gotthard Bahn.
July 24: At least 21 people have been killed and 510 more injured in a stampede at the Love Parade dance music festival in the German city of Duisburg.

August 
August 6: One person died and about 40 were injured in a train derailment in Naples, Italy, on the Circumvesuviana railway.
August 17
A sewage tanker lorry struck and derailed a passenger train on a level crossing at Little Cornard, England. 21 people were injured.
The Intercity-Express from Frankfurt to Paris hit a truck that had slid onto the rail near Lambrecht. The first two carriages derailed and ten people were injured.

September 
September 19: A woman armed with an automatic weapon has shot dead three people and injured 18 others at a hospital in Germany before being killed by police.
September 26: A Polish tourist bus returning from Spain careered into a bridge on a rain-soaked German motorway, killing 13 people.

October 

October 1: 40 people were injured when a train derailed at Skotterud, Norway.
October 4: Nine people died and 122 were injured in flooding from a ruptured red sludge reservoir at the Ajkai Timföldgyár alumina plant, Hungary.
October 12
A bus packed with rush-hour commuters crashed into a train at a level crossing in Ukraine after jumping a red traffic light, killing 45 people and leaving another 9 wounded.
At most 3.5 million people attended a series of demonstrations organised by the French Union leaders throughout France.

November 
November 11: More than 25,000 students protested in Dublin against increased student fees.

December 
December 10: Former Prime Minister of Croatia, Ivo Sanader, was arrested in Austria over charges of corruption.

Deaths 
January
 January 11
 Miep Gies, 100, Dutch humanitarian (b. 1909)
 Eric Rohmer, 89, French film director (b. 1920)
 January 19 - Panajot Pano, 70, Albanian footballer (b. 1939)
 January 22 - Jean Simmons, 80, British actress (b. 1929)
February
 February 1 - Steingrimur Hermannsson, 81, 19th Prime Minister of Iceland (b. 1928)
 February 6 - John Dankworth, 82, British jazz musician and composer (b. 1927)
 February 11 - Alexander McQueen, 40, British fashion designer (b. 1969)
 February 14 - Dick Francis, 89, British author and jockey (b. 1920)
March
 March 3 - Michael Foot, 96, British politician (b. 1913)
 March 12 - Miguel Delibes, 89, Spanish author and journalist (b. 1920)
 March 21 - Wolfgang Wagner, 90, German festival director (b. 1919)
 March 22
 James Black, 85, British pharmacologist and Nobel Prize laureate (b. 1924)
 Valentina Tolkunova, 63, Soviet and Russian singer (b. 1946)
 March 27 - Vasily Smyslov, 89, Soviet-Russian chess grandmaster (b. 1921)
 March 30 - Martin Sandberger, 98, German army officer (b. 1911)
April
 April 6 - Corin Redgrave, 70, British actor and political activist (b. 1939)
 April 8 - Malcolm McLaren, 64, British musician and manager (b. 1946)
 April 10
 Ryszard Kaczorowski, 90, Polish statesman (b. 1919)
 Lech Kaczynski, 60, President of Poland (b. 1949)
 April 16 - Tomas Spidlik, 90, Czech cardinal (b. 1919)
 April 21 - Juan Antonio Samaranch, 89, Spanish sports official (b. 1920)
 April 25 - Alan Sillitoe, 82, British writer (b. 1928)
 April 30 - Paul Mayer, 98, German cardinal (b. 1911)
May
 May 2 - Lynn Redgrave, 67, British actress (b. 1943)
 May 4 - Luigi Poggi, 92, Italian cardinal (b. 1917)
 May 5 - Giulietta Simionato, 99, Italian opera singer (b. 1910)
 May 8 - Andor Lilienthal, 99, Hungarian chess grandmaster (b. 1911)
 May 15 - Besian Idrizaj, 22, Austrian footballer (b. 1987)
 May 17
 Bobbejaan Schoepen, 85, Belgian singer (b. 1925)
 Yvonne Loriod, 86, French pianist (b. 1924)
 May 18 - Edoardo Sanguineti, 79, Italian writer (b. 1930)
 May 31 - Louise Bourgeois, 98, French-born American sculptor (b. 1911)
June
 June 1 - Andrei Voznesensky, 77, Soviet-Russian poet (b. 1933)
 June 2 - Giuseppe Taddei, 93, Italian baritone (b. 1916)
 June 3 - Vladimir Arnold, 72, Soviet-Russian mathematician (b. 1937)
 June 9 - Marina Semyonova, 101, Russian ballerina (b. 1908)
 June 10 - Sigmar Polke, 69, German painter and photographer (b. 1941)
 June 14 - Leonid Kizim, 68, Soviet-Ukrainian cosmonaut (b. 1941)
 June 16 - Ronald Neame, 99, British cinematographer, producer and director (b. 1911)
 June 18 
 Marcel Bigeard, 94, French military officer (b. 1916)
 Jose Saramago, 87, Portuguese writer and Nobel Prize laureate (b. 1922)
 June 26 - Algirdas Brazauskas, 77, 9th President of Lithuania (b. 1932)
July
 July 2 - Beryl Bainbridge, 76, British novelist (b. 1934)
 July 5 - Cesare Siepi, 87, Italian opera singer (b. 1923)
 July 17 - Bernard Giraudeau, 63, French actor and film director (b. 1947)
 July 24 - Alex Higgins, 61, Northern Irish snooker player (b. 1949)
August
 August 6 - Tony Judt, 62, British historian (b. 1948)
 August 7 - Bruno Cremer, 80, French actor (b. 1923)
 August 12 - Guido de Marco, 79, 6th President of Malta (b. 1931)
 August 16 - Nicola Cabibbo, 75, Italian physicist (b. 1935)
 August 17 - Francesco Cossiga, 82, 63rd Prime Minister and 8th President of Italy (b. 1928)
 August 18 - Carlos Hugo of Bourbon-Parma, 80, Spanish aristocrat (b. 1930)
 August 26 - Raimon Panikkar, 91, Spanish theologian (b. 1918)
 August 27 - Anton Geesink, 76, Dutch judoka (b. 1934)
 August 30 - Alain Corneau, 67, French filmmaker (b. 1943)
 August 31 - Laurent Fignon, 50, French road bicycle racer (b. 1960)
September
 September 9 - Bent Larsen, 75, Danish chess grandmaster (b. 1935)
 September 12 - Claude Chabrol, 80, French film director (b. 1930)
 September 29 - Georges Charpak, 86, French Nobel physicist (b. 1924)
October
 October 4 - Norman Wisdom, 95, British actor and comedian (b. 1915)
 October 9 - Maurice Allais, 99, French Nobel economist (b. 1911)
 October 14 - Benoit Mandelbrot, 85, French-American mathematician (b. 1924)
 October 30 - Harry Mulisch, 83, Dutch writer (b. 1927)
November
 November 2 - Rudolf Barshai, 86, Soviet-Russian conductor and violist (b. 1924)
 November 3 - Viktor Chernomyrdin, 72, 31st Prime Minister of Russia (b. 1938)
 November 5 - Hajo Herrmann, 97, German fighter pilot and lawyer (b. 1913)
 November 10 - Dino De Laurentiis, 91, Italian film producer (b. 1919)
 November 12 - Henryk Gorecki, 76, Polish composer (b. 1933)
 November 13 - Luis Garcia Berlanga, 89, Spanish film director (b. 1921)
 November 17 - Isabelle Caro, 30, French model and actress (b. 1930)
 November 29
 Bella Akhmadulina, 73, Soviet-Russian poet (b. 1937)
 Mario Monicelli, 95, Italian actor, screenwriter and director (b. 1915)
December
 December 12 - Tom Walkinshaw, 64, British racing car driver and team owner (b. 1946)
 December 21 - Enzo Bearzot, 83, Italian footballer and coach (b. 1927)

References 

 
2010s in Europe
Years of the 21st century in Europe